Chambersburg Area Senior High School (CASHS) is a public high school located in Franklin County, Pennsylvania. The school serves grades 9, 10, 11, and 12. Students come from Chambersburg and surrounding townships of Hamilton, Greene, Lurgan, Letterkenny and Guilford.

As of the 2020–2021 school year, the school had an enrollment of 2,182 students and 118.06 classroom teachers on a FTE basis, for a student-teacher ratio of 18.48. CASHS has occupied its current facilities since 1955.

Extracurricular activities and Color Day
Chambersburg Area Senior High School offers a wide variety of extracurricular activities and an extensive sports program.  In addition to a full range of sports, the school also maintains a band, an orchestra, a glee club, a student newspaper, a national honors society, a national art honors society, a variety of language clubs, a math club, a ping pong club, a ski club, an economics club, a sports club, a drama club, a camera club, a religious fellowship, a student government, a small business club, and a number of other organizations.

Chambersburg Area Senior High School is also well known for its Color Day tradition.  Every year since the early 1920s, classes are suspended for a series of games and competitions between the freshmen, sophomore, junior, and senior classes.  The term Color Day originated from the hues given to the different grades: gold and blue are worn by future graduates of an odd numbered year (example 2013) and red and white for the even numbered years (example 2014).

Athletics
The 7,000-seat Trojan Stadium was overhauled in 2006 as part of a $6.5 million renovation project that included additional home seating and renovated visitors bleachers, along with a new press box. Other enhancements to the facility included artificial turf, a running track, concession stands, restrooms, ticket booths and parking lots. The Trojans called Henninger Field their home for football from 1898 until 1956, for soccer from 1968–2003 and 2005, and for baseball from the early 1900s until 2006.

The district funds:

Boys
Baseball - AAAA
Basketball- AAAA
Cross Country - AAA
Football - AAAA
Golf - AAA
Lacrosse - AAAA
Soccer - AAA
Swimming and Diving - AAA
Tennis - AAA
Track and Field - AAA
Volleyball - AAA
 Wrestling - AAA

Girls
Basketball - AAAA
Cross Country - AAA
Field Hockey - AAA
Golf - AAA
Gymnastics - AAAA
Lacrosse - AAAA
Soccer (Fall) - AAA
Softball - AAA
Swimming and Diving - AAA
Girls' Tennis - AAA
Track and Field - AAA
Volleyball - AAA

On June 18, 2004, the Chambersburg Area Senior High School Trojans boys baseball team won the Pennsylvania Interscholastic Athletic Association (PIAA) Class AAA state championship, defeating Peters Township High School by 12-5, in a game played at RiverSide Stadium in Harrisburg.
Coming on the heels of this state title, the baseball team was ranked 7th in the Eastern United States by USA Today in their final 2004 rankings.

The Girls' Gymnastics team was recognized as the 2005 team state champion in the State Silver Division.

Track-and-field team member Lorraine Hill had the second-longest girls high school javelin throw in the nation in 2006 with a throw of 157 feet, four inches. Hill won the 2006 Pennsylvania Interscholastic Athletic Association Class AAAA state javelin championship, won second-place finish at the Penn Relays and finished third at the Nike Team Nationals Outdoor competition in the javelin that year. Hill was named a first-team All-American by American Track & Field Magazine for her achievements in 2006.

References

External links 
Chambersburg Area Senior High School
National Center for Education Statistics for Chambersburg Area Senior High School
Chambersburg Area Senior High School Web page at Great Schools Web site
Alumni Site for the CASHS Class of 1968

High schools in Central Pennsylvania
Educational institutions established in 1955
Chambersburg, Pennsylvania
Schools in Franklin County, Pennsylvania
Public high schools in Pennsylvania
1955 establishments in Pennsylvania